The Australian Veterinary Association (AVA) is a not-for-profit association representing more than 6000 Australian veterinarians working in private practice, government, industry, and academia.  The AVA was mooted before the First World War but not founded until 1921.  The nineteenth century predecessor organisation was the Australasian Veterinary Medical Association.

Prominent veterinarians who have been members of the Australian Veterinary Association include Professor J.D. Stewart (who was the first AVA President), Ian Clunies Ross (former head of the CSIRO), and parasitologist Hugh Gordon.

The AVA provides information resources, continuing education opportunities, publications, public education programs, and professional support. The AVA also lobbies government on a number of fronts. Special interest groups have existed within the AVA since the early 1960s. These include groups dedicated to equine medicine, cattle, practice management, avian health, sheep, conservation and animal welfare. Some of the special interest groups publish their own peer reviewed journals. The Australian Veterinary History Society is a division of the association. Recent lobbying efforts include live cattle export and research into the deadly Hendra Virus.

The AVA has published the Australian Veterinary Journal since 1925.

Past and current presidents

2019 - current: Dr Julia Crawford
2017-2019: Dr Paula Parker
2015-2017: Dr Robert Johnson
2012-2014: Dr Ben Gardiner
2010-2012: Dr Barry Smyth
2008-2010: Dr Mark Lawrie
2007-2008: Dr Dianne Sheehan
2006-2007: Dr Kersti Seksel 
2005-2006: Dr Matt Makin 
2004-2005: Dr Norm Blackman
2002-2003: Dr Joanne Sillince 
2001-2002: Dr Robert Baker
2000-2001: Dr Ian Denney
1999-2000: Dr Garth McGilvray 
1998-1999: Dr Geoffrey Niethe
1997-1998: Dr Roger Clarke 
1996-1997: Dr Bill Scanlan
1995-1996: Dr Pamela Scanlon 
1994-1995: Dr Michael Banyard 
1993-1994: Dr Jakob Malmo 
1991-1992: Dr John Plant
1989-1990: Dr Ian Fairnie
1988-1989: Professor Mary Barton 
1987-1988: Dr Russell Duigan 
1986-1987: Dr Terence Collins 
1985-1986: Dr David Lindsay 
1983-1984: Dr Jack Arundel
1982-1983: Dr Helen Jones
1981-1982: Dr Bryan Woolcock
1980-1981: Dr William Pryor 
1978-1979: Dr Ian Pearson 
1966-1967: Dr Bruce Eastick

Past notable board members
 Sam McMahon, an Australian politician for the Country Liberal Party and a Senator for the Northern Territory in the Parliament of Australia in 2019, served on the board from 2004-2009.

References 

Veterinary medicine-related professional associations
Professional associations based in Australia
1921 establishments in Australia
Veterinary organizations
Veterinary medicine in Australia